Vodino is a rural locality (a selo) in Shelestovskoye Rural Settlement, Oktyabrsky District, Volgograd Oblast, Russia. The population was 147 as of 2010. There are 4 streets.

Geography 
Vodino is located in steppe, on Yergeni, 42 km northeast of Oktyabrsky (the district's administrative centre) by road. Shelestovo is the nearest rural locality.

References 

Rural localities in Oktyabrsky District, Volgograd Oblast